Luke Watt (born 20 June 1997) is a Scottish footballer who plays as a defender for Stranraer.

He has previously played for Motherwell, Airdrieonians, Stranraer, East Fife, Croatian side NK Novigrad, Brechin City and Linlithgow Rose.

Career

Club
On 4 January 2015, Watt made his debut for Motherwell, starting in a 2–0 defeat against Aberdeen. On 2 March 2015, Watt signed a new contract with Motherwell until the summer of 2018.

On 31 August 2016, Watt signed on loan for Stranraer, on a deal until January 2017. On 31 January 2017, he went out on loan again, joining East Fife for the remainder of the season.

On 18 August 2017, Watt went out on loan a third time, this time joining Airdrieonians. Watt was released by Motherwell at the end of the 2017–18 season.

After a spell in Croatia with NK Novigrad, Watt signed for Brechin City in June 2019.

Linlithgow Rose announced the signing of Watt on 19 December 2020.

Career statistics

References

External links
 Luke Watt profile at Motherwell FC official website
 

1997 births
Living people
Footballers from Glasgow
Scottish footballers
Association football defenders
Motherwell F.C. players
Stranraer F.C. players
East Fife F.C. players
Airdrieonians F.C. players
NK Novigrad players
Brechin City F.C. players
Scottish Professional Football League players
Second Football League (Croatia) players
Scottish expatriate footballers
Expatriate footballers in Croatia
Linlithgow Rose F.C. players